South West Surrey is a constituency represented in the House of Commons of the UK Parliament. Since 2005, the seat has been represented by Conservative MP Jeremy Hunt, the current chancellor of the Exchequer and the former Culture Secretary, Health Secretary and Foreign Secretary.

Boundaries

1983–2010: The District of Waverley wards of Alford and Dunsfold, Busbridge, Hambledon and Hascombe, Chiddingfold, Elstead, Peper Harow and Thursley, Farnham Bourne, Farnham Castle, Farnham Hale and Heath End, Farnham Rowledge and Wrecclesham, Farnham Upper Hale, Farnham Waverley, Farnham Weybourne and Badshot Lea, Frensham, Dockenfield and Tilford, Godalming North, Godalming North East and South West, Godalming North West, Godalming South East, Haslemere North and Grayswood, Haslemere South, Hindhead, Milford, Shottermill, and Witley.

2010–present: The Borough of Waverley wards of Bramley, Busbridge and Hascombe, Chiddingfold and Dunsfold, Elstead and Thursley, Farnham Bourne, Farnham Castle, Farnham Firgrove, Farnham Hale and Heath End, Farnham Moor Park, Farnham Shortheath and Boundstone, Farnham Upper Hale, Farnham Weybourne and Badshot Lea, Farnham Wrecclesham and Rowledge, Frensham, Dockenfield and Tilford, Godalming Binscombe, Godalming Central and Ockford, Godalming Charterhouse, Godalming Farncombe and Catteshall, Godalming Holloway, Haslemere Critchmere and Shottermill, Haslemere East and Grayswood, Hindhead, Milford, and Witley and Hambledon.

The seat includes the towns of Farnham, Godalming and Haslemere.

Fifth Periodic Review of Westminster constituencies
The Boundary Commission's recommendations implemented by Parliament for 2010 saw the realignment of the boundary with Guildford in order to bring it in line with adjustment of local government wards. Guildford's electorate was the largest of the county and this aimed to reduce it. Two wards split between the two constituencies: Bramley; and Busbridge and Hascombe, afterwards entirely in South West Surrey; and the ward 'Alfold, Cranleigh Rural and Ellens Green' was split, so it was consolidated into Guildford for the 2010 general election. The net effect was to increase the number of voters in South West Surrey and reduce the number in Guildford.

A public review was called, dealing primarily with objections to receiving the rest of Bramley. Many petitioned to argue that the village's links, especially transport, were mainly with Guildford rather than the towns of Godalming (or Farnham). The precedent of the previous review was cited, when a proposal to move Bramley out of Guildford and into Mole Valley was rejected after local opposition. However, the review felt that this did not justify splitting the ward (something the Boundary Commission seeks to avoid completely) and that the other parts of the ward had strong links to Godalming. Furthermore, it cited the point that, in the previous review, Bramley Parish Council had stated that if it were to be moved it would prefer to be moved to South West Surrey and thus argued that the previous objection had accommodated a preferred progressive change towards being wholly in South West Surrey if necessary to equalise electorates.

History
The constituency was created in 1983, largely replacing the former seat of Farnham. It has been consistently won by the Conservative Party, though the majority dropped to a mere 861 votes in 2001, leaving it as the Liberal Democrats' third target constituency by swing required. Since then, the Conservative majority has substantially increased, exceeding 28,000 votes in 2015.

In the 2011 referendum on adopting the Alternative Vote (AV) system, Waverley Borough, which includes the constituency, rejected the proposal by 72.6%. In the 2016 referendum on the UK's membership of the European Union, Waverley voted to remain in the European Union by 58.4%.

In the 2017 general election, the Green Party endorsed Dr Louise Irvine, of the National Health Action Party, and did not field its own candidate in an attempt to unseat the incumbent Jeremy Hunt as a result of his controversial record as the Secretary of State for Health. Some local members of the Labour and Liberal Democrat parties also advocated not fielding a candidate for their respective parties. However, the national Labour party declined to withdraw in the seat, saying that it would impose its own candidate if necessary, and Labour party members who publicly supported Dr Irvine were expelled. The Liberal Democrats also declined to withdraw. In 2019, Dr. Irvine declined to stand and endorsed the Liberal Democrat candidate. At the election, the Liberal Democrats polled over 17,000 more votes - an almost 30% vote share increase - compared to 2017, however Hunt retained his seat by 8,817 votes.

Prominent members 
Virginia Bottomley, the MP from 1984 to 2005, became the Secretary of State for Health in 1992 (a Privy Council level office). She then served as the Secretary of State for National Heritage from 1995 to 1997. She was elevated to the House of Lords as Baroness Bottomley of Nettlestone in 2005, having left the House of Commons in the same year.

Jeremy Hunt served as the Secretary of State for Culture, Olympics, Media and Sport, Secretary of State for Health, Secretary of State for Foreign and Commonwealth Affairs, Chair of the Health and Social Care Select Committee and more recently, Chancellor of the Exchequer.

Constituency profile
The constituency includes one end of the Greensand Ridge, including the Devil's Punch Bowl and visitor centre at Hindhead.  The area has two railways, a branch line via Farnham, the Alton Line and the Portsmouth Direct Line.  The A3 three-lane highway passes through the seat.

Workless claimants (registered jobseekers) were in November 2012 significantly lower than the national average of 3.8%, at 1.5% of the population based on a statistical compilation by The Guardian.

The constituency is sometimes known as Surrey South West.

Members of Parliament

Elections

Elections in the 2010s

Elections in the 2000s

Elections in the 1990s

The seat underwent boundary changes between the 1992 and 1997 general elections and thus vote share changes are based on a notional calculation.

Elections in the 1980s

Notes

References

See also
 List of parliamentary constituencies in Surrey

Sources
 Election result, 2005 (BBC)
 Election results, 1997 – 2001 (BBC)
 Election results, 1997 – 2001 (Election Demon)
 Election results, 1983 – 1992  (Election Demon)
 Election results, 1992 – 2010 (Guardian)
 By-election result, 1984
 UK Constituency Maps

Parliamentary constituencies in South East England
Constituencies of the Parliament of the United Kingdom established in 1983
Politics of Surrey
Jeremy Hunt